Lieutenant James McDonald  (born 23 July 1899, date of death unknown) was a British World War I flying ace credited with eight aerial victories.

Military service
McDonald served as an observer/gunner in No. 22 Squadron RAF, flying the Bristol F.2b two-seater fighter, and gained his first aerial victory on 31 May 1918 by shooting an Albatros D.V down in flames over Neuve-Chapelle. On 2 June he gained a double victory driving down an Albatros D.V and Albatros C south-east of La Bassée. In these victories he was piloted by Second Lieutenant Leslie Walter King. For his next two, on 3 and 23 June, he was piloted by Lieutenant John Everard Gurdon, driving down a Fokker D.VII east of La Bassée on both occasions. With Captain George William Bulmer he flamed another Albatros C north of Bois-de-Phalempin on 9 July, then with Lieutenant Frank George Gibbons he drove down two more Fokker D.VIIs over Douai on 27 August and 5 September.

References

1899 births
Year of death missing
Royal Flying Corps officers
People from Renfrew
British World War I flying aces
Scottish flying aces
Recipients of the Distinguished Flying Cross (United Kingdom)
Royal Air Force personnel of World War I
Military personnel from Renfrewshire